Marriage in Name Only is a 1930 German drama film directed by Heinz Paul and starring Evelyn Holt, Erika Dannhoff, and Wolfgang Zilzer.

The film's sets were designed by Robert A. Dietrich.

Cast

References

Bibliography

External links 
 

1930 films
1930 romantic drama films
Films of the Weimar Republic
German romantic drama films
1930s German-language films
Films directed by Heinz Paul
German black-and-white films
1930s German films